Sir Frederick Willis CB KBE (16 March 1863 - 17 June 1946) was an English lawyer and civil servant.  He was made CB in 1914 and KBE in 1920.  He was chairman of the Board of Control for Lunacy and Mental Deficiency 1921-1928.

References 

1863 births
1946 deaths
Companions of the Order of the Bath